Sonya Hana, Lady Wright (9 January 1927 – 24 July 2007) was a British ballerina and actress. 

She trained in dance with Lydia Kyasht and Audrey DeVos. For a short time she was a member of the Sadler's Wells Theatre Ballet but soon the appeal on musicals led her into productions such as The King and I.

Hana was married to director and choreographer Sir Peter Wright from 1954 until her death on 24 July 2007, aged 80. The couple had two children.

Filmography
 A Bullet in the Ballet (1947)
 The Planter's Wife, as Ah Moy (1952)
 Colonel March Investigates (1953)
 Death in the Dressing Room (1954)
 The Cruel Test, as Lanna (1955)
 Madam Butterfly as Butterfly (1957)

References

1927 births
2007 deaths
British ballerinas
20th-century British actresses
20th-century British ballet dancers
Wives of knights